Ince Rose Bridge are an amateur rugby league football club based in Ince-in-Makerfield, Greater Manchester. The club's first team plays in the National Conference League.

External links
 Official website
 Rose Bridge on the NCL website

BARLA teams
Rugby league teams in Greater Manchester
Sport in the Metropolitan Borough of Wigan
English rugby league teams